Monique Noel (born April 28, 1967) is a glamour model and actress. She was chosen as Playboy's Playmate of the Month for May 1989.  Her centerfold was photographed by Richard Fegley.  She was born in Salem Oregon.

Partial filmography
 Renegade (1996) as Cheri
 I Like to Play Games (1995) as Valerie
 Blossom (1993) as Claire
 Herman's Head (1993) as Gigi 
 Meatballs 4 (1992) as Lovelie #1 (as Monique de Lacy)
 Mobsters (1991) as Showgirl (as Monique Noel Lovelace)
 Road House (1989) as Barfly 
 Bert Rigby, You're a Fool  (1989) as Jim Shirley's Girlfriend
 What Price Victory (1988)

See also
 List of people in Playboy 1980–1989

References

External links

1967 births
Living people
1980s Playboy Playmates
Actresses from Salem, Oregon
21st-century American women